The 2016 Pro Bowl (branded as the 2016 Pro Bowl presented by USAA for sponsorship reasons) was the National Football League's all-star game for the 2015 season, which was played at Aloha Stadium in Honolulu, Hawaii on January 31, 2016. As of 2023, this was the last time the Pro Bowl was held in Hawaii.

Andy Reid of the Kansas City Chiefs and Mike McCarthy of the Green Bay Packers were selected to coach the teams due to their teams being the highest seeded teams from each conference to lose in the Divisional Round of 2015–16 NFL playoffs, which has been the convention since the 2010 Pro Bowl. On January 27, Mike McCarthy announced that he would not be coaching the Pro Bowl due to an illness and also announced that assistant head coach Winston Moss would take over head coaching duties. This was also the sixth consecutive year that the Pro Bowl took place prior to the Super Bowl. At the Pro Bowl Draft, the Chiefs' coaching staff was assigned to Team Rice, and the Packers' coaching staff was assigned to Team Irvin.

The game continued the fantasy draft format that debuted with the 2014 Pro Bowl. The two teams were to be drafted and captained by two Hall of Famers, Jerry Rice (winning 2014 Pro Bowl captain) and Michael Irvin (winning 2015 Pro Bowl captain). Darren Woodson and Eric Davis served as defensive co-captains for Irvin and Rice respectively, in both cases reuniting two former teammates (Irvin and Woodson were teammates on the Dallas Cowboys from 1992 to 1999, while Rice and Davis played together with the San Francisco 49ers from 1990 to 1995). The Fantasy draft was held January 27 at 7:30 P.M. EST on ESPN2 at Wheeler Army Airfield in Wahiawa, Hawaii as part of an extension to the NFL's military appreciation campaign.

Game format
The game format was nearly the same for 2016 as it had been in 2015. The previous year's experimental rule of kicking the point after touchdown from the 15-yard line became a permanent rule. The goal posts remained at their normal 18-foot width in 2016, as compared to the narrower 14-foot width from the 2015 Pro Bowl.
Two former players drafted players onto the teams. Each was assisted by two player captains and one NFL.com fantasy football champion. Michael Irvin was assisted by player captains Geno Atkins and Devonta Freeman, while Jerry Rice was assisted by player captains Odell Beckham Jr. and Aaron Donald.
Forty-three players were assigned to each team, down from 44 in 2015 (a regular game-day active roster has 46).
A two-minute warning was given in the first and third quarters (as well as in the second and fourth quarters), and the ball changed hands after each quarter.
The coin toss determined which team was awarded possession first. There were no kickoffs; the ball was placed on the 25-yard line at the start of each quarter and after scoring plays.
Defenses were now permitted to play cover two and press coverage. Prior to 2014, only man coverage was allowed, except for goal line situations.
Beginning at the two-minute mark of every quarter, if the offense did not gain at least one yard, the clock stopped as if the play were an incomplete pass.
The game clock started after an incomplete pass on the signal of the referee, except inside the last two minutes of the first half and the last five minutes of the second half.
A 35-second/25-second play clock was used instead of the usual 40-second/25-second clock.
The game clock did not stop on quarterback sacks outside the final two minutes of the game. Formerly, the clock stopped on these situations outside the final two minutes of the second and fourth quarters.

Summary

Starting lineups

Box Score

Rosters

Team Rice

Team Irvin

Selected but did not participate

Notes:
Players must have accepted their invitations as alternates to be listed; those who declined, such as Philip Rivers, are not considered Pro Bowlers.

 signifies the player was selected as a captain
Replacement selection due to injury or vacancy
Injured/suspended player; selected but did not participate
Selected but did not play because his team advanced to Super Bowl 50 ''(see Pro Bowl "Player Selection" section)
Source for selections and replacements

Number of selections per team

Broadcasting
The game was televised nationally by ESPN, which has the exclusive broadcast rights to the Pro Bowl through to 2022.

Westwood One radio broadcast the game nationally, with Kevin Kugler on play-by-play, Tony Boselli on color commentary, and Laura Okmin on the sidelines.

References

External links

Official website of the Pro Bowl

2016
2015 National Football League season
2016 in American sports
2016 in Oceanian sport
American football competitions in Honolulu
2016 in sports in Hawaii
January 2016 sports events in the United States
21st century in Honolulu